The Chugush is the highest mountain in Adygea, Russia, located in the Western Caucasus. The mountain has 10 glaciers covering an area of 1.2 km2. One of the glaciers feeds the Kisha River flowing towards the Belaya River.

See also
 List of highest points of Russian federal subjects

References

External links 
 Article in the Great Soviet Encyclopedia

Mountains of Adygea
Three-thousanders of the Caucasus
North Caucasus
Highest points of Russian federal subjects